Petr Kutal (born 31 August 1988) is a retired Czech Nordic combined skier. He was born in Nové Město na Moravě.

Highlights of his career include a bronze medal at the Universiade in Harbin in 2009 and a third rank with the team at the Junior World Championships in Rovaniemi in 2005.

He represented the Czech Republic at the FIS Nordic World Ski Championships 2015 in Falun.

References

External links 
 

1988 births
Living people
Czech male Nordic combined skiers
Universiade medalists in nordic combined
Universiade bronze medalists for the Czech Republic
Competitors at the 2009 Winter Universiade
Competitors at the 2015 Winter Universiade
People from Nové Město na Moravě
Sportspeople from the Vysočina Region